Lupescu is a surname of Romanian origin, derived from the Romanian word lup ("wolf"), from Latin lupus ("wolf"). Its Italian equivalent is Lupo, its French equivalent is Loup, its Catalan equivalent is Llopis, its Spanish equivalent is López, and its Portuguese equivalent is Lopes.

The name may refer to:
 Magda Lupescu (1895–1977), mistress of King Carol II
 Ioan Lupescu (b. 1968), retired Romanian footballer
 Jannick Lupescu (b. 1993), Dutch tennis player
 Nicolae Lupescu (1940–2017), retired Romanian footballer
 Valya Dudycz Lupescu (b. 1974), Ukrainian-American writer
 Miss Lupescu, a character from Neil Gaiman's The Graveyard Book

Romanian-language surnames